The Wrightsville Dam was a 19th-century dam on the lower Susquehanna River between Wrightsville and Columbia, Pennsylvania.

The low-head dam was constructed in 1840 to impound the waters of the Susquehanna to provide a slackwater pool to allow the safe passage of canal boats from the Pennsylvania Canal on the Columbia (Lancaster County) side across the mile-wide rocky river to the Susquehanna and Tidewater Canal on the Wrightsville (York County) side.

See also 
List of dams and reservoirs of the Susquehanna River

References 

Dams in Pennsylvania
Dams on the Susquehanna River
Buildings and structures in Lancaster County, Pennsylvania
Buildings and structures in York County, Pennsylvania
Dams completed in 1840